The 2014 FIA Junior World Rally Championship was the thirteenth season of the Junior World Rally Championship, an auto racing championship recognized by the Fédération Internationale de l'Automobile, running in support of the World Rally Championship. It was previously known as the WRC Academy.

The Junior World Rally Championship was open to drivers under the age of twenty-eight. All teams contested in six European events, with all of their score counting towards their final championship position, in identical Citroën DS3 R3Ts using Michelin tyres.

The championship went to Stephane Lefebvre, who secured the title in Rallye de France Alsace with one round to spare. Alastair Fisher finished second, one point behind of Lefebvre and Martin Koči finished the championship third.

Calendar

The final 2014 Junior World Rally Championship calendar consisted of six European events, taken from the 2014 World Rally Championship.

Drivers

The following drivers competed in the championship.

Rule changes
 Citroën Racing will become the car supplier for the 2014 and 2015 seasons, providing identical Citroën DS3 R3T that falls under the Group R3 regulations. They replace M-Sport, who prepared identical Ford Fiesta R2 cars for the series—previously known as the WRC Academy—since its inception in 2011.
 Michelin will replace Hankook as the tire supplier for the series.
 All competitors registered in the Championships–WRC, WRC-2, WRC-3 and the Junior WRC—will be obliged to use a colour-coded windscreen sticker to distinguish its category.
 All competitors registered for the Junior WRC will be registered for scoring points in the World Rally Championship-3.
 Competitors will no longer score points per Stage Win. Only the final result of each rally counts toward the championship.

Rally summaries

Notes

Standings

FIA Junior World Rally Championship for Drivers

FIA Junior World Rally Championship for Co-Drivers

FIA Junior World Rally Championship for Nations

References

External links
Official website of the World Rally Championship
Official website of the Fédération Internationale de l'Automobile

2014 in rallying